József Takács (14 March 1884 – 2 February 1961) was a Hungarian politician, who served as Minister of Agriculture for few days in 1919.

References
 Magyar Életrajzi Lexikon

1884 births
1961 deaths
People from Orosháza
People from the Kingdom of Hungary
Social Democratic Party of Hungary politicians
Agriculture ministers of Hungary